Top team from each zone will qualify to final round in which promoted team to 2016 Ýokary Liga will be decided.

Balkan Zone 
 Balkan-2
 Awaza
 Galkynyş Türkmenbaşy
 Gumdag
 Hazar Tolkuny
 Nebitgurluşyk
 Sary-Daş - 1 place
 Şagadam-2
 Ýaşlyk

Central Zone 
 Altyn-Taç
 Kerwen
 Diýar
 Hasyl
 Köpetdag Aşgabat - 1 place
 Kopetdag-2
 MGSK

Daşoguz Zone 
 Almaz
 Aral
 Arzuw
 Dostluk
 Eshret (Akdepe)
 Görogly
 Obahyzmat
 Standard - 1 place

Mary Zone 
 Agzybirlik 
 Energetik-2
 Futbol Mekdep-1
 Futbol Mekdep-2
 Jemagat
 Kuwwat
 Merw-2
 MTS
 Nesip
 Ýolöten

Promotion tournament 
From 23 to 28 November in Dashoguz  was held tournament for the right to play in the Ýokary Liga 2016. Tournament is played on round-robin basis.

 FC Bagtyyarlyk-Lebap (Türkmenabat)
 Kopetdag (Ashgabat) 
 Marguş (Mary District)
 Standart (Daşoguz)
 Sary-daş (Serdar)

See also
2015 Turkmenistan Cup 
2015 Ýokary Liga

References

2015 in Turkmenistani football